John Metcalf may refer to:
 John Metcalf (Massachusetts politician), a representative to the Great and General Court
 John Metcalf (civil engineer) (1717–1810), British civil engineer
 John Metcalf (athlete) (born 1934), British hurdler
 John Metcalf (writer) (born 1938), Canadian writer and editor
 John Metcalf (racing driver), NASCAR series driver, see 1999 NASCAR Winston Cup Series
 John Metcalf (composer) (born 1946), British (Welsh) and Canadian composer
 Jack Metcalf (politician) (1927–2007), American politician

See also
John Metcalfe (disambiguation)